Wolff Olins is a British advertising agency and corporate identity consultancy. It was started in 1965 and has offices in London, New York City and San Francisco. It now employs some 150 designers, strategists, technologists, programme managers and educators, and has been part of the Omnicom Group since 2001. 

It has worked in sectors including technology, culture, retail, energy & utilities, media and non-profit.

The logo for the 2012 Olympic Games, designed by the agency in 2007, was included in Extraordinary Stories about Ordinary Things, an exhibition in 2012 at The Design Museum in London. The logo, which cost £400,000, was largely criticised by the British public, being described as "puerile".

Also in 2012, designs for the Orange and London Olympics were included in a retrospective examining design from 1948 to 2012 at the V&A in London.

In the same year the firm was listed by The Sunday Times as one of the "best small companies to work for", and was in 31st place on list of the "best places to work" compiled by Ad Age magazine. In 2018 Fast Company magazine placed the company at the head of a list of the "most innovative design firms".

History
Wolff Olins was founded in Camden Town, London, in 1965 by designer Michael Wolff and advertising executive Wally Olins. Wolff left the business in 1983, and Olins in 2001; Wolff is still active in the field of branding, and Olins died on 14 April 2014. Wolff Olins currently has offices in London, New York City and San Francisco.

In 2002, Wolff Olins was selected by the British Library as a subject of their National Life Stories oral history project.

In 2017, Sairah Ashman was appointed as the first female CEO of Wolff Olins.

Work
From 1965 to the early 1990s, Wolff Olins developed corporate identities for various large European companies. During this time Olins published The Corporate Personality (1978) and Corporate Identity (1989). Olins defined corporate identity as "strategy made visible", and the firm worked with companies including BOC (1967), The Beatles' Apple Records (1968), Bovis (1971), Volkswagen's VAG (1978), 3i (1983), Prudential (1986) and BT (1991).

During the 1990s, Wolff Olins focused more on corporate branding. The company's work during that time includes First Direct (1989), Orange (1994), Odeon (1997), Heathrow Express (1998), Tata Group (2000), Unilever flower U logo (2004), and the BBC Reith blocks logo (2021).

Criticism
Some of Wolff Olins' work has received controversial reception. Its piper design for BT in 1991 attracted a great deal of opposition. The company was also responsible for the short-lived $110m (£75m) re-branding of PwC Consulting to Monday in 2002. The launch of the London 2012 brand in 2007 was met with widespread public derision. Design critic Stephen Bayley condemned the London 2012 Olympic Games logo as "a puerile mess, an artistic flop and a commercial scandal".

In July 2021 Wolff Olins designed a rebranding for, the then largest active asset manager in the UK, Standard Life Aberdeen plc to change its name to Abrdn. Although pronounced Aberdeen this vowelless name was met with widespread ridicule and was the butt of many online jokes. An online poll of investors described the rebrand of Standard Life Aberdeen as an “act of corporate insanity”.

References

External links
 Wolff Olins
 Oral History of Wolff Olins on British Library's National Life Stories

Branding companies of the United Kingdom
Business services companies established in 1965
1965 establishments in England